Zweizz is the primary performing alias of Norwegian musician and composer Svein Egil Hatlevik (born May 27, 1977).

History
Hatlevik started using the Zweizz alias in 2003 after leaving the Norwegian black metal group Dødheimsgard. According to Hatlevik, Zweizz should be considered a one-man band, not a solo project. Hatlevik defines the musical style of Zweizz as a mixture of IDM, noise, electroacoustic music and black metal.

Hatlevik also uses the pseudonym Zweizz in other bands which he is also a member of, such as Umoral and Pronounced "Sex". As a member of Dødheimsgard he used the aliases "Hologram" and "Magic/Logic".

The first Zweizz release was the 7" EP Black Necrotic Obfuscation, issued through Vendlus Records in 2004. On March 24, 2007 Zweizz released his debut album The Yawn of the New Age, also through Vendlus Records. Later the same year Epicene Sound Systems released an untitled Zweizz cassette EP in a limited quantity of 30 copies. Side B of this release is built entirely from recordings of the Soviet ANS synthesizer.

In 2011, the Norwegian record company Jester Records released the album Zweizz & Joey Hopkins that Hatlevik had been making with the late US composer and musician Joey Hopkins before the death of the latter in 2008.

Hatlevik is also a founding member of the avant-garde metal group Fleurety.

Discography

As Zweizz
 Black Necrotic Obfuscation (EP, Vendlus Records) – (2004)
 The Yawn of the New Age (Full length, Vendlus Records) – (2007)
 Untitled (Cassette, Epicene Sound Systems) – (2007)

Split releases
 Kringsatt av fiender (Split with RU-486, Cassette, Destructive Industries) – (2009)

Cooperation projects
 "Shiva Gives Me a Hand Whenever I Need One, Then I Fuck the Bitch" on an untitled EP in cooperation with Winters in Osaka (2008)
 Zweizz & Joey Hopkins (Full length, Jester Records) – (2011)

Guest appearances
 "Cynic" and "Whore" on Demo I by Dementia Absurda (2007)
 "Satyr's Birth" on the EP Red Tooth, Red Claw by Winters in Osaka (2008)
 "The Shift" on the album Zoom Code by ThanatoSchizO (2008).
 "He Came as Swarms" on the album The Silver Hour by Swarms (2008).
 "Swarming Locusts" and "Submission to Falsities" on the album Syndicate of Lethargy by Execration (2008).

Remixes
 "Kledt i nattens farget" from the tribute album My Own Wolf: A New Approach (2007)
 "There Is Need – The Extreme Zweizz Fuckover" featured on the remix album The Circular Drain by Solefald (2008).

With Dødheimsgard
Satanic Art (Mini CD) (1998)
666 International (1999)

With Fleurety

 Black Snow (Demo) – (1993)
 A Darker Shade of Evil (EP) – (1994)
 Min Tid Skal Komme (Full length) – (1995)
 Last-Minute Lies (EP) – (1999)
 Department of Apocalyptic Affairs – (2000)
 Min Tid Skal Komme (Reissue) – (2003)
 Ingentes Atque Decorii Vexilliferi Apokalypsis – (2009)
 Evoco Bestias – (2010)
 Et Spiritus Meus Semper Sub Sanguinantibus Stellis Habitabit – (2013)
 Fragmenta Cuinsvis Aetatis Contemporaneae – (2017)
 The White Death – (2017)

With Pronounced "Sex"
 XXX (Interregnum Records) – (2008)

With Stagnant Waters
 Stagnant Waters (Adversum) – (2012)

With Succuba
Black Pizza (Handmade Records) - (2016)

With Umoral
 Untitled (EP, Vendlus Records) – (2007)

Line-up
Svein Egil Hatlevik – Computer, Vocals (Fleurety, Umoral, Pronounced "Sex", ex-Dødheimsgard)

References

External links 
 Vendlus Records 
 Zweizz official homepage (Currently redirects to MySpace)
 Interview 2007 
 Interview 2007 
 [ Zweizz on Allmusic.com ]

Norwegian black metal musical groups
Musical groups established in 2003
2003 establishments in Norway
Musical groups from Oslo